C.T. Venugopal (1907–1972) was an Indian civil services officer and was a member of the Indian Railways Accounts Services.

Family
Venugopal was the second son of C. Tiruvenkatachari and Padmammal. His older brother was the mathematician C.T. Rajagopal and his younger brother was the philosopher C.T.K. Chari. They also had a sister, Kamala, who married a civil servant, R.P. Sarathy, who served as defense secretary under Krishna Menon.

Career
He was the first officer to be recruited to form the IRAS in 1930. He was considered to have been responsible for dividing up the railway assets during partition of India and Pakistan. He was also a member of the Railway board. Along with K.P. Mushran, he edited a book about Indian Railways. IRAS commemorates C.T.Venugopal with memorial lectures every year.

Personal life
He converted to Christianity from Hinduism and also published religious papers and books including Witness to Christ.

After his retirement, he settled in Vellore near Christian Medical College & Hospital due to an illness, where died in 1972.

There is a prize named in his honor at Christian Medical College & Hospital.

References

1907 births
1972 deaths